Pyeongtaek nongak is a nongak or Korean farmer's music which has been performed and handed down in the Pyeongtaek region of Gyeonggi Province. 

There are five types of nongak in Korea: Wootdari (웃다리) nongak of Gyeonggi and Chungcheong, Left Jeolla nongak, Right Jeolla nongak, Southeastern Korea (Yeongnam,  영남) nongak, and Eastern Gangwon-do (Yeongdong, 영동) nongak. Each nongak has its unique representation of Korean culture and has been recognized as an important intangible cultural asset in each region.  

It was designated as the eleventh asset of the Important Intangible Cultural Property by the South Korean government on December 1, 1985. Since then, there have been a lot of performances in and out of South Korea.

Origins
Pyeongtaek has had open fields called Sosabeol, 소사벌 and traditionally its people have farmed. This was a crucial background for developing Pyeongtaek nongak. In Gyeonggi and Chungcheong provinces, there were many professional performing groups and Geollippaes (걸립패) which were  performing nongak groups (though sometimes monk groups) asking for money and food while entertaining village people. Cheongyongsa Temple near Pyeongtaek was a base for the troupes of strolling player (Namsadang, 남사당패) at the end of Joseon Dynasty.

Features of Pyeongtaek nongak
The professional performing groups had a great effect on the Doorepaes (두레패), organizations for doing collaborative agricultural work in villages in Pyeongtaek, Anseong and Hwaseong. As a result, nongak has been developed in these areas. Pyeongtaek nongak was designated as an important intangible cultural asset in 1985 and won recognition as a representative nongak inheriting the authenticity of Wootdari nongak. Although Wootdari nongak doesn't have many cords in diversity, people play variations. Also it has some characteristics in its speedy tones, power, and linking and disconnecting rhythms. Its typical rhythms are Chilchae (칠채) and JJeokJJeoki (쩍쩍이) which is sometimes called jajeunsamchae (잦은 삼채).
Performers wear military uniforms and hats in Joseon Dynasty or in some cases peaked hats worn by Buddhist monks and nuns, along with colorful cloth strips around their body.

Pangut
Pangut (판굿) is a kind of Pungmulnori (풍물놀이) which is a Korean folk music tradition that includes drumming, dancing, and singing. It is performed with kkwaenggwari (a small handheld gong, 꽹과리), janggu (hourglass drum, 장구), buk (barrel drum, 북), and jing (gong, 징) and the wind instrument taepyeongso (태평소). According to a prefabricated order, they play the scene of spree and show their talents.

Performers and audience sing and dance together. Wootdari Pangut (웃다리 판굿) usually consists of 30 performers. Followed by the agricultural banners (농기, 農期) which say "Agriculture is the prop of the country" or "Agriculture forms the basis of national existence", taepyeongso (태평소), kkwaenggwari (꽹과리), jing (징), janggu (장구), buk (북), beopgo (법고) which is a big drum that is used in a temple players are the next and at the end there are dancers (무동, 舞童).

Performing formations
Pyeongtaek nongak has various performing formations. The Dangsanbeolim (당산벌림) are formation and Moodongnori (무동놀이) a dance of boys playing on the top of adult's shoulders. Dunjilsawi (던질사위), Apdwigondoo (앞뒤곤두), Mangyeongchangpadotdaesawi (a sail dance, 만경창파돛대사위), Dongeori (동거리) and Gokmadan (circus troupes, 곡마단) performed by dancers make Pyeongtaek Nongak unique.

People in Pyeongtaek nongak
Choi Eun-chang   was recognized as the most skilled in Pyeongtaek Nongak Binari. Lee Seong-ho was a Binari singer and Janggu player Lee Se-jin who had a perfect voice for singing Binari. As buk players, Kim Yong-rae, Kim Yook-dong and Lee Se-jin are famous.

See also
Pungmul
Namsadang
Samul nori
Music of Korea

References 

ptonggak.or.kr
pyeongtaek cityhall
cha.go.kr
blog.naver.com
ocp.go.kr
blog.empas.com
ptnongak.or.kr

External links
nongak photos
photos

Important Intangible Cultural Properties of South Korea